Shadow Sleep is the third studio album from the American metal band Starkill. It was released in 2016 and was their first album featuring vocalist Sarah Lynn Collier, albeit she provided mostly backing vocals on this release.

Track listing

Personnel
Band members
Spencer Weidner - drums
Parker Jameson - vocals, guitars, keyboards, orchestrations, programming, engineering
Tony Keathley - guitars, vocals
Shaun Andruchuk - bass

Guest/session musician(s)
Sarah Lynn Collier - female vocals
Gabrielle Comeau - additional female choir vocals on "Through the Darkness"
Tamara Filipović - additional female choir vocals on "Through the Darkness"

Miscellaneous staff
Charles Macak - recording, mixing, engineering
Troy Glessner - mastering
Gustavo Sazes - artwork
Stephen Jensen - photography
Nedim Melkic - assistant engineer

References

2016 albums
Starkill albums
Prosthetic Records albums